Chinese shortbread, is a Chinese snack. It is round shaped, and white or yellow in colour. There may have cracks on the surface of the shortbread. It's fluffy in texture and sweet in taste.

Ingredients  
Commonly used ingredients are:
 Flour
 Water
 White sugar
 Baking powder
 Corn starch
 Egg white

See also
White sugar sponge cake

References

Hong Kong cuisine
Chinese pastries